Kitchen Super Star (season 4) is a 2015-2015 Tamil competitive cooking show which aired on Vijay TV from 14 February 2015 through 11 July 2015.  Suresh, Chef Dhamu and Chef Venkatesh Bhat were the judges.

References

External links
Star Vijay US

2015 Indian television seasons